The Ministry of Health (MOH) of the Union of Soviet Socialist Republics (USSR), formed on 15 March 1946, was one of the most important government offices in the Soviet Union. It was formerly (until 1946) known as the People's Commissariat for Health. The Ministry, at the all-Union level, was established on 6 July 1923, after the signing of the Treaty on the Creation of the USSR, and was, in turn, based upon the People's Commissariat for Health of the RSFSR formed in 1917. The Ministry was led by the Minister of Health, prior to 1946 a People's Commissar, who was nominated by the Chairman of the Council of Ministers and confirmed by the Presidium of the Supreme Soviet, and was a member of the Council of Ministers.

Duties and responsibilities
The main duties of the ministry were to develop and to prepare these for legislation and to maintain a decent level of health organisation in the USSR. The ministry missariat monitored and supervised the application of standards and measures to improve Soviet health care. According to the July 1936 decree establishing the People's Commissariat for Health, the commissariat had control over all financial assets related or linked to health care. As such, the ministry controlled all financial functions regarding health. It coordinated medical personnel all over the country, but also local council deputies. MOH was obliged to take active measures against deficiencies in the health care system, and to further develop and implement measures to improve it.

The MOH, with the help of other ministries and Soviet institutions, was responsible for the construction of new medical institutions around the country. Maintenance of hospital and other medical institutions were carried out by the MOH and the State Committee for Construction. According to the Regulations on the Ministry of Health of the USSR, MOH was responsible for maintenance and the construction of public health care services, and organising and conducting forensic medical and forensic psychiatric examination and establishing public pharmaceutical services. It was also assigned to develop and publish guidelines on organising and improving curative and preventive care, maternal and child health and to oversee the formulation of therapeutic and preventive work in health care.

The competence of the MOH within the jurisdiction of the USSR was periodically reviewed by the Council of Ministers.

Organisation
The Ministry of Health was an all-union ministry, which meant that it controlled the fifteen ministries of health of the union republics. The union health ministries, in turn, were in charge of the autonomous oblasts and district health departments. The union ministries, along with the oblasts and the district health departments, were in control of the public hospitals and medicine in their area.

History
A July 1936 decree by the Central Executive Committee and the Council of People's Commissars established the People's Commissariat for Health. Grigory Kaminsky, having served as People's Commissar for Health of the RSFSR, became the first commissar of the All-Union Commissariat for Health. Kaminsky was arrested in 1938 after his speech in 1937 which denounced the ongoing stalinist repression in the country (Great Purge). In a very short period of time since the formation of the commissariat, the diseases and viruses which had for a long time been a major problem had been eliminated. In 1946, the People's Commissariat for Health was renamed Ministry of Health.

Commissars and ministers
The following persons headed the Commissariat/Ministry as commissars (narkoms), ministers, and deputy ministers of the Soviet time:

See also

 Government of the Soviet Union (Council of Ministers) – Ministries
 Ministry of Medical Industry

References

External links
Governments of  the Union of Soviet Socialist Republics from 1917–1964 and 1964–1991

Health
Soviet Union
Health, Ministry of
Health in the Soviet Union